Carmine Saponetti (12 June 1913 – 31 October 1990) was an Italian racing cyclist. He won stages 4 and 6a of the 1939 Giro d'Italia.

References

External links
 

1913 births
1990 deaths
Italian male cyclists
Italian Giro d'Italia stage winners
Place of birth missing
Sportspeople from the Province of Caserta
Cyclists from Campania